Jeffrey Duerk is provost of the University of Miami in Coral Gables, Florida.

Education
Duerk received his BS degree in electrical engineering from Purdue University, his MS degree in electrical engineering from Ohio State University, and his PhD in biomedical engineering from Case Western Reserve University in 1987.

Career
Duerk has served on the faculty of Case Western Reserve University, where he was dean of the Case School of Engineering, and was named an IEEE fellow in 2015 for contributions to rapid magnetic resonance imaging technologies.

University of Miami
In 2017, Duerk was named provost and executive vice president for academic affairs at the University of Miami.

References 

Living people
Year of birth missing (living people)
Fellow Members of the IEEE
Place of birth missing (living people)
University of Miami staff
American electrical engineers